Alasdair Donald MacDuff Liddell  (15 January 1949 – 31 December 2012) was one of the architects of Britain's health strategy in the 1990s. As Director of Planning at the Department of Health (1994–2000), he led the process of setting national priorities for the National Health Service (NHS).

Education 
Liddell was educated at Fettes College in Edinburgh, and Balliol College, Oxford (1967–70). He moved from the voluntary sector to health management and as chief of the East Anglian Regional Health Authority he pioneered the Rubber Windmill, a simulation involving large numbers of clinicians, health managers, journalists and others over several days, which tested (and found wanting) the government's plans to introduce internal markets to the NHS. The Windmill was highly influential and led to changes in the government's approach. Liddell's simulation idea has since been used repeatedly to assess the impact of the market-based reforms, notably for the King's Fund in 2007.

Career 
He resigned, reputedly over policy differences with ministers, and subsequently acted as an advisor to health charities like the King's Fund (where he was a Senior Associate) and to health sector companies and consultancies. He was Senior Counsel to Bell Pottinger and was non-executive Deputy Chairman of Healthcare Locums plc, effectively taking executive responsibility in early 2011 when the company was found to have financial irregularities leading to the suspension of the company's chief executive Kate Bleasedale.

He was promoted by Ken Jarrold to Director of Planning. As Director of Planning at the Department of Health Liddell had Board level responsibility for strategy, NHS information and IT, NHS Communications, and a number of key policy areas. After the 1997 election he led the team supporting Ministers in laying the foundations for much of current government policy for the NHS. He was awarded the CBE in the Queen's Birthday Honours 1997 for services to the NHS.

He died at age 63 of an aneurysm he suffered while visiting friends in London.

Family
Liddell married Jenny Abramsky in 1976. They had two children.

Works 

 Co-authored the report Technology in the NHS: Transforming the patient's experience of care. 23 October 2008.
 Co-authored Windmill 2009: NHS response to the financial storm. 2009.

References

1949 births
Place of birth missing
2012 deaths
Administrators in the National Health Service
Alumni of Balliol College, Oxford
Commanders of the Order of the British Empire
People educated at Fettes College